Universal Classics and Jazz (UCJ) is the name of two record label divisions of the Universal Music Group record company.

Current divisions

UCJ Germany
Universal Music Classics & Jazz (Germany) is a division of Universal Music Germany and is marketed under websites called Klassik Akzente and Jazz Echo.

UCJ Japan (a.k.a. UM-CLJZ) 
This Universal Music Japan subsidiary formerly operated as two separate labels: Universal Classics and Universal Jazz.

On 2013, Universal Music Japan merged the two labels into one. The label name is now Universal Classics and Jazz (UM-CLJZ).

Defunct divisions

UCJ (UK)

Universal Classics and Jazz was a division of the Universal Music Group based in London, United Kingdom. The UCJ roster included Jamie Cullum, Aled Jones, Nicola Benedetti and Katherine Jenkins.

At the time that Katherine Jenkins was signed to the label in 2003, she had signed the then-largest record deal in United Kingdom classical recording history, reportedly worth £1 million.

The label group was dismantled in 2011 with the restructuring of Universal Music UK's classical operations, as well Universal Music Group International's greater restructuring of its classical labels. The dismantling of UCJ ensued the revival of Decca Records in the UK, under the instigation of Max Hole, the newly appointed Chief operating officer (COO) of Universal Music Group International.

References

External links
 – official site (UK)
 – official site (JP)

Klassikakzente
JazzEcho

British record labels
German record labels
Jazz record labels
Classics